The Bombsters is a Canadian studio band based in Hamilton, Ontario.  The group formed in 2009, and comprises Chas Andersson (keyboards), percussion and vocals), Ernest Mallais (guitar and vocals), Ryan Price (bass and vocals), Sean Rosen (guitars and vocals) and Mr. Somebody (drums).

Discography
Velocity (2010)
Highway 6 (2011)
The Bombsters (2013)

References

Musical groups established in 2009
Musical groups from Hamilton, Ontario
Canadian power pop groups
2009 establishments in Ontario